Bella Vista (Spanish and Italian for "beautiful sight") is the name of several places in the world:

Places

Argentina
Bella Vista, Buenos Aires
Bella Vista, Corrientes
Bella Vista, Tucumán

Australia
Bella Vista, New South Wales, a suburb of Sydney
Bella Vista (homestead), a farm and homestead that pre-dates the suburb

Belize
Bella Vista, Belize

Bolivia
Bella Vista, Beni

Canada
Bella Vista (Cumberland), a neighbourhood of Cumberland, Ottawa, Ontario

Dominican Republic
Bella Vista, Dominican Republic,  a neighborhood of Santo Domingo

India
Bella Vista, Hyderabad

Mexico
Bella Vista Municipality, Chiapas

Panama
Bella Vista, Chiriquí
Bella Vista, Panama City

Paraguay
Bella Vista, Amambay, a frontier town on Paraguayan-Brazilian border
Bella Vista, Itapúa

Peru
Bella Vista, Loreto Region, Maynas; see Napo River

South Africa
Bella Vista, Western Cape

United States
Bella Vista, Arkansas
Bella Vista, California, in Shasta County
Bella Vista, Pennsylvania, a place in Lycoming County, Pennsylvania
Bella Vista, Philadelphia, Pennsylvania, a neighborhood
Bella Vista High School, in Fair Oaks, California

Uruguay
Bella Vista, Montevideo, one of the "barrios" of Montevideo
Bella Vista, Maldonado, a village in Maldonado Department
Bella Vista, Paysandú, a village in Paysandú Department, Uruguay

Sport
Bella Vista de Bahía Blanca, an Argentine football club
Club Atlético Bella Vista, a Uruguayan football club

See also
Bela Vista
Bellavista (disambiguation)
Belle Vista, Georgia